The Presbyterian Church in Korea (KoRyuPa) is an orthodox Calvinist denomination in South Korea.
The church is also known as the Korean Reformed Presbyterian Church. The denomination was a result of the split of the Presbyterian Church in Korea (Koshin) due tensions in the KoRyu Seminary. Pastor Park Yun-Sun moved to Seoul and founded the Reformed Theological Seminary. To avoid division Park returned to Koshin but Chung Hun-Teuk took over as the director in the Seminary. In 1965 about 50 pastors was associated with the Seminary. The denomination has close contact with conservative Reformed churches in Japan, Netherlands and the United States. The church has approximately 80,000 members in 500 congregations and 16 presbyteries. No women ordination. It had 501 ordained ministers. The church subscribes the Westminster Confession of Faith, and  the Apostles Creed. Since 1977 the leading figure of the church has been Yoo Don-Sik, who also directs the Reformed Theological Seminary too.

References 

Presbyterian denominations in South Korea